
Girolamo Dalla Casa (also known as Hieronymo de Udene, died 1601) was an Italian composer, instrumentalist, and writer of the late Renaissance. He was a member of the Venetian School, and more influential as a performer than as a composer.

Nothing is known about his life prior to his arrival at Venice, but he was probably born at Udine sometime before the middle of the 16th century. He was first hired by the musical establishment of St Mark's Basilica on 29 January 1568, along with his two brothers, Giovanni and Nicolò, where they formed the first permanent instrumental ensemble.. The sonorous acoustical environment of this basilica was the center of activity of the Venetians. Giovanni Gabrieli clearly had Dalla Casa's group in mind for much of his music, and the Dalla Casas are presumed to have played in many the elaborate polychoral compositions of the time.

In 1572, Dalla Casa served as Venetian agent for the purchase of a large number of wind instruments and printed editions of music for the court of John of Austria, half-brother of Philip II of Spain and hero of the Battle of Lepanto in the previous year. The transaction, made though the Spanish resident ambassador in Venice, Diego Guzmán de Silva, came to the considerable sum of 154 scudi, 3 lire, and 20 soldi in gold. The instruments purchased included four tenor and two soprano shawms, six alto cornetts, five mute cornetts, two large [bass?] cornetts, two dulcians, and trumpets from Nuremberg and Augsburg. An unusually large sum was charged for a "'cassa di flauti grossi" (chest of large recorders), which may have included several SATB consorts. The music included five printed books by Cipriano de Rore, four books by Orlando di Lasso, four books by Vincenzo Ruffo, and a collection by Pedro Guerrero, as well as other books whose contents were not specified in the receipt, which is dated 20 February 1572 and signed in Dalla Casa's hand.

Dalla Casa was a virtuoso player of the cornett, which he described as 'the most excellent of all the wind instruments ... because it mimics the human voice better than the other instruments do'.

The use of the Dalla Casas by Gabrieli and St. Mark's foreshadowed, and may have influenced, the development of the concertino-ripieno style of the concerto grosso in the later Baroque. Being a smaller group of virtuoso instrumentalists playing in contrast to larger instrumental and vocal forces arrayed around them, and being in the center of a hugely influential stylistic movement, they functioned as an early form of concertino. Much of the music which Gabrieli and the other Venetians wrote for them survives.

Two books of madrigals and one book of motets survive from his compositional output, which probably was not large. More important to musicology, however, was his two-part 1584 treatise on ornamentation (Il vero modo di diminuir), which gives clear and precise examples of ornamentation as it was practiced in singing and playing French chansons and Italian madrigals at the time. In contrast to earlier ornamentation treatises, Dalla Casa introduced short ornamental patterns with jerky and discontinuous rhythms, such as the tremoli groppizati and groppi battute, to emphasize particular notes and heighten their emotional effect. Diminutions on intervalic skips of sixths, sevenths, and octaves also appear for the first time in this treatise, which is therefore regarded as marking the end of the purely Renaissance style of ornamentation and the beginnings of Baroque practice. From this treatise it is clear that polyphonic works were usually performed unadorned, but works in a more homophonic style, and especially grand polychoral works with frequent sectional changes and prominent cadences, were embellished with ornaments, few of which appear in the actual notated music.

Selected publications

References

Further reading

External links 

Year of birth unknown
1601 deaths
Cornett players
Italian classical composers
Italian male classical composers
Italian music theorists
Renaissance composers
Venetian School (music) composers